Thunjanur  is a village in the  
Avadaiyarkoilrevenue block of Pudukkottai district, Tamil Nadu, India.

References

Villages in Pudukkottai district